Handshakes and Heartbreaks is the debut studio album by American rock band Roses Are Red.

Track listing
 "Hello, Cruel World" (3:01)
 "When Late Becomes Early" (3:07)
 "Handshakes and Heartbreaks" (3:29)
 "The Legend" (3:32)
 "Angela" (3:31)
 "Jumping Off Bridges" (2:49)
 "Diamonds are Forever" (2:53)
 "Leaving Detroit" (2:48)
 "Death and Texas" (2:49)
 "A Month of Sundays" (3:24)

Personnel
Vincent Minervino - vocals/piano
Michael Lasaponara - drums
Kevin Mahoney - bass guitar
Matthew Gordner - guitar
Brian Gordner - guitar

2003 albums
Roses Are Red (band) albums